Nixonia is a genus of wasps. It is the only member of the family Nixoniidae in the superfamily Platygastroidea. They are amongst the largest of the platygastroids at up to 9 mm in length. Members of the genus are known from Africa, the Indian subcontinent and Southeast Asia. The biology of only one species is known, which parasitises orthopteran eggs.

Taxonomy 

 Nixonia atra Masner, 1970
 Nixonia bini Johnson & Masner, 2006 
 Nixonia corrugata Johnson & Masner, 2006
 Nixonia elongata Johnson & Masner, 2006
 Nixonia flavocincta Johnson & Masner, 2006
 Nixonia gigas Johnson & Masner, 2006
 Nixonia krombeini Johnson & Masner, 2006
 Nixonia lamorali Johnson & Masner, 2006
 Nixonia masneri van Noort & Johnson, 2009 
 Nixonia mcgregori van Noort & Johnson, 2009 
 Nixonia pecki Johnson & Masner, 2006
 Nixonia pretiosa Masner, 1958  .
 Nixonia priesneri Johnson & Masner, 2006
 Nixonia sicaria Johnson & Masner, 2006
 Nixonia stygica Johnson & Masner, 2006
 Nixonia watshami Johnson & Masner, 2006

References

Platygastroidea